Gotti is a solo album by American rapper Berner. It was released on December 3, 2021 via Bern One Entertainment/EMPIRE. Production was primarily handled by Cozmo. It features guest appearances from Cozmo, Benny the Butcher, Conway the Machine, Kevin Cossom, Future, Jadakiss, Madeline Lauer, Janelle Marie, Millyz, Mozzy, Nas, Ryn Nicole, Rod Wave, Rick Ross, Styles P, Ty Dolla $ign, Wiz Khalifa, and John Gotti's trial tapes. On the Billboard charts in the United States, the album peaked at number 23 on the Billboard 200, number 11 on Top R&B/Hip-Hop Albums, number 4 on Top Rap Albums, and number 2 on the Independent Albums chart.

Track listing

Charts

References

External links

2021 albums
Hip hop albums by American artists
Albums produced by Maxwell Smart (record producer)